This is a list of operational hydroelectric power stations in the United States with a current nameplate capacity of at least 100 MW.

The Hoover Dam in Arizona and Nevada was the first hydroelectric power station in the United States to have a capacity of at least 1,000 MW upon completion in 1936. Since then numerous other hydroelectric power stations have surpassed the 1,000 MW threshold, most often through the expansion of existing hydroelectric facilities. All but two states of the United States are home to at least one hydroelectric power station, those without being Delaware and Mississippi.

List of power stations

Under construction
This is a list of hydroelectric power stations under construction with an expected nameplate capacity of at least 100 MW.

See also
List of power stations in the United States by type
List of hydroelectric power stations in Canada

References

Big Creek, California, 1,050 MW hydroelectric with some pumped storage.

https://newsroom.edison.com/stories/100-years-young:-big-creek-hydroelectric-plant-still-going-strong

Built from 1912 to 1949, with pumped storage completed in the 1980's.

External links

Hydro
 
United States